Ruthy Tu (?-1969, also known as Tu Guan-chiao or Rosie Du) was a British-trained Chinese aviator who was one of the most prominent Chinese fliers in the 1930s. In 1932, she became the first Chinese woman to earn a pilot's license and the first woman to join the Chinese Army as a pilot. 

Tu later moved to Taiwan and became the first woman in that country to join the Baháʼí Faith in 1952, along with two men. She was active in the Baháʼí Assembly in Taiwan until her death in 1969.

References

Citations

Bibliography

Date of birth missing
1969 deaths
Chinese Bahá'ís
Chinese aviators
Chinese women aviators
Converts to the Bahá'í Faith